Stawek may refer to the following places:
Stawek, Łódź Voivodeship (central Poland)
Stawek, Gmina Cyców in Lublin Voivodeship (east Poland)
Stawek, Gmina Spiczyn in Lublin Voivodeship (east Poland)
Stawek, Masovian Voivodeship (east-central Poland)
Stawek, Warmian-Masurian Voivodeship (north Poland)